Abbeville Historic District is a historic district in Abbeville, South Carolina. It includes several properties listed separately in the National Register of Historic Places, including the Abbeville County Courthouse and the Abbeville Opera House. The district was listed in National Register on September 14, 1972.

Originally, it was roughly bounded by Seaboard Coastline RR, SR 72, Rickey, Haight, Hemphill and Haigler Sts. A 1972 decrease of area, roughly E of Magazine St., S of Whitehall St., NW along Long Branch St., W of Lemon St., N along Washington St., decreased the size of the district.  According to the National Register Information System (NRIS), this decrease was approved simultaneously as the original district designation. A 1984 increase, of area roughly W along N. Main St. from Haigler to Livingston Sts., N along Greenville St., and NE on Marshall Ct., added to the district.

History
The district includes a large portion of Abbeville, the county seat of Abbeville County.  The city, formed in the late 18th century, played a role in the political history of the area, including one of the first public meetings regarding succession from the Union, a precursor to the Civil War. Most of the commercial buildings in the district are representative of the late 19th and early 20th centuries, primarily due to three large fires in 1872 - 1873. The subsequent redevelopment gave the town square its present appearance.

The original nomination form included sixteen sites that contributed to the historical significance of the district. These buildings included a mix of residential (ten) and commercial (five) structures, and greenspace (one):

 Abbeville Press and Banner Building
 Ace Hardware Building (1831)
 Old Bank Building
 Abbeville Opera House
 Abbeville County Courthouse (1903)
 The Burt House (c. 1830)
 Secession Hill
 Trinity Episcopal Church (1860)
 Quay-Adams House
 Wardlaw-Klugh House (1831)
 Lee-Reid House (1885)
 McGowan-Barksdale House (1888)
 Gary-Harris-Wren House (1885)
 Harris House (1886)
 Gary-DuPree House (c. 1885)
 Shillito-Townsend House (c. 1830)

The boundary increase that occurred on May 7, 1984, added numerous properties to the district. The district now contains 37 properties of significance, 282 supporting properties, and 209 non-contributing properties for a total of 528 sites. Most of the structures are still standing, although the addresses used in the nomination form may have changed.

See also
 List of Registered Historic Places in South Carolina
 National Register of Historic Places listings in Abbeville County, South Carolina

References

External links
 
 Abbeville, South Carolina
 Abbeville County, South Carolina
 Abbeville Historic District

Historic districts on the National Register of Historic Places in South Carolina
Geography of Abbeville County, South Carolina
National Register of Historic Places in Abbeville County, South Carolina